Ayk Tigranovich Kazaryan (born 18 July 1993) is a Russian football player.

Club career
He made his professional debut in the Russian Professional Football League for FC Solyaris Moscow on 12 July 2014 in a game against FC Dnepr Smolensk.

He made his Russian Football National League debut for FC Torpedo Armavir on 20 July 2015 in a game against FC Arsenal Tula.

References

External links
 
 
 Career summary by sportbox.ru

1993 births
Russian people of Armenian descent
Living people
Russian footballers
Association football forwards
FC Solyaris Moscow players
FC Armavir players